This article contains a List of multi-member constituencies in the United Kingdom and predecessor Parliaments. It is sub-divided for England, Wales, Scotland and Ireland (including Northern Ireland from 1922).

This list excludes periods when a constituency only returned one member. The from date is the year from which the multi-member constituency is known to have been regularly represented. The until date is the year when the constituency was either disenfranchised or ceased to have more than one member. It covers the Parliament of England, the Protectorate Parliament, the Parliament of Scotland, the Parliament of Ireland, the Parliament of Great Britain and the Parliament of the United Kingdom.

In some cases there were earlier periods of enfranchisement in the Parliament of England but those before the sixteenth century are excluded from this list. In the English and Welsh sub-lists the 'Prot' column only covers the first two Protectorate Parliaments (1654-1658). The English and Welsh seats in the third Protectorate Parliament (1659) used the same seats as the '<1826' column. For the Scottish and Irish sub-lists the 'Prot' column includes all three Protectorate Parliaments. 
 
At present only the number of seats by constituency for the last Parliament of Scotland before the Union have been identified. The multi-member constituencies in that Parliament may well be much older.

Multi-member constituencies in England 

Article names are followed by (UK Parliament constituency). The constituencies which existed before 1832 were all part of the Parliament of England (from the date indicated until 1707), the Parliament of Great Britain (1707-1800) and the Parliament of the United Kingdom (from 1801).

Due to the lack of survival of records, it is not certain when in the thirteenth century most of the counties and the older boroughs were enfranchised. All the historic counties, except Cheshire and Durham, are deemed to have been enfranchised in 1290 for the purposes of this list. The oldest parliamentary boroughs are deemed to have been enfranchised in 1295, when a contemporary official list is available. However, as the 1295 list does not include London it may not be complete.

Many counties and boroughs may have been represented at Simon de Montfort's Parliament of 1265 or other early Parliaments for which no exact records are available. The earliest known Parliament to which knights of the shire (representing counties) were summoned was in 1258 and the earliest known attendance of burgesses (representing boroughs) was at the 1265 meeting, but it is not known which counties and boroughs were involved.

A

B

C

D

E

F

G

H

I

K

L

M

N

O

P

Q

R

S

T

W

Y

Notes:-
 a Before the constituency was regularly enfranchised, it sent members to the First and Second Protectorate Parliaments 1654–1658.
 b In 1826 the representation of Yorkshire was increased to 4 seats.
 c In 1861 the representation of South Lancashire was increased to 3 seats.

Multi-member constituencies in Wales 

Article names are followed by (UK Parliament constituency). The constituencies which existed before 1832 were all part of the Parliament of England (from the date indicated until 1707), the Parliament of Great Britain (1707-1800) and the Parliament of the United Kingdom (from 1801).

For the purposes of this list Monmouthshire is treated as part of Wales throughout its existence as a Parliamentary county, although before the twentieth century it was regarded as part of England.

Note:-
 a Enfranchised with one seat in 1542, but given two seats in the First and Second Protectorate Parliaments (1654-1658), before being allocated two seats again in 1832.

Multi-member constituencies in Scotland 

Constituency names until 1707 are followed by (Parliament of Scotland constituency). Those from 1708 are followed by (UK Parliament constituency). The constituencies which existed before the Union in 1707 were all part of the Parliament of Scotland (from a currently unestablished date until 1707). Apart from the members co-opted to the 1st Parliament of Great Britain, who are treated in this list as representing Scotland as an undivided whole, there were no Scottish multi-member constituencies from 1707 until the boundary changes for the Parliament of the United Kingdom seats in 1832.

See the List of Constituencies in the Parliament of Scotland at the time of the Union for more details, including a discussion of the possible inaccuracy of the constituency and shire names in the list.

Note:-
 a Edinburgh was allocated two seats in the Protectorate Parliaments (1654-1659). There were two commissioners from Edinburgh in the Parliament of Scotland. In 1708-1832 the city was represented by one member of the Westminster Parliament.
 b The members for Scotland, in the 1st Parliament of Great Britain, were co-opted by the last pre-Union Parliament of Scotland from amongst its elected members.

Multi-member constituencies in Ireland 

Every constituency in the Irish House of Commons elected two members up to its dissolution in 1800. Every County returned two members to the UK House of Commons from 1801 until 1885.

References
 British Electoral Facts 1832-1987, compiled and edited by F.W.S. Craig (Parliamentary Research Services 1989)
 The Constitutional Year Book 1900 (William Blackstone & Sons 1900) out of copyright
 Electoral Reform in England and Wales, by Charles Seymour (David & Charles Reprints 1970) 
 The Statutes: Second Revised Edition, Vol. XVI 1884-1886 (printed by authority in 1900)

Political history of the United Kingdom
Parliament of the United Kingdom